The R394 road is a regional road in Ireland linking the N55 in County Cavan to Mullingar in County Westmeath. It passes through the town of Castlepollard and several villages and hamlets en route. 
 

See also
Roads in Ireland
National primary road
National secondary road

References
Roads Act 1993 (Classification of Regional Roads) Order 2006 – Department of Transport

Regional roads in the Republic of Ireland
Roads in County Westmeath
Roads in County Cavan